Cigarette is a public artwork by United States artist Tony Smith, located on the grounds of the Albright Knox Art Gallery in Buffalo, NY. The sculpture is over 15 feet tall and made of flat planes of steel in a twisted form. This is the first in an edition of three (with one artists proof); no. 2 is at MOMA in New York.

A small scale version of the work is in the collection of the Saint Louis Art Museum.

See also
 List of Tony Smith sculptures
 The Tony Smith Artist Research Project in Wikipedia

References

Outdoor sculptures in New York (state)
Sculptures by Tony Smith
1961 sculptures
Steel sculptures in New York (state)
Albright–Knox Art Gallery